Together for Catalonia may refer to:
Together for Catalonia (2017), an electoral alliance and parliamentary group in Catalonia, established and maintained since the 2017 regional election.
Together for Catalonia (2020), a political party established in July 2020 by former Catalan president Carles Puigdemont.